Harry Kisoensingh (22 September 1954 in Nickerie District, Suriname –  27 April 2008), was chairman of the Union of Progressive Surinamese and was a Surinamese educator.

In 1991, he was first elected to the National Assembly of Suriname. He served as vice Chairman of the National Assembly of Suriname from 1996 to 2000, while being in the opposition.

On 30 May 1999, he was re-elected to the chairmanship of the HPP. The HPP became part of the Union of Progressive Surinamese in 2004.

Uncovered scandals 

He uncovered several political scandals:
Illegal sand and clay digging activities at plantation Waterloo
Illegal transactions at Staatsolie

References

Surinamese educators
1954 births
2008 deaths
Members of the National Assembly (Suriname)
Surinamese people of Indian descent
Surinamese Hindus
Union of Progressive Surinamese politicians